Instinct: Decay is the third full-length album by Nachtmystium. It was rated the 4th best album of the year by Decibel Magazine. The album was released on CD by Battle Kommand Records and on Vinyl by Profound Lore Records and Autopsy Kitchen Records.

According to Blake Judd, the album is a metaphor for his views on society's decline. In an interview with DEAF SPARROW Zine, Judd stated the album's themes revolve around his idea humans have a natural inclination to harm themselves through "personal greed, lust, and power". Judd considers these vices to be the cause of society's ills, including war, indifference, and one's own self-destruction.

The album's cover art was designed by Rebecca Clegg.

Track listing

Production
Produced By Azentrius & Chris Black
Recorded, Engineered & Mixed By Chris Black
Mastered By Scott Hull

Personnel
Azentrius - lead & rhythm guitar, vocals
Sinic - rhythm guitar
Lord Imperial - bass
Wargoat Obscurum - drums
Chris Black - additional lead guitar
Marcus Launsberry - additional rhythm guitar

References

External links
 Nachtmystium Website
 Instinct: Decay on Encyclopaedia Metallum
 Nachtmystium Interview

Nachtmystium albums
2006 albums
Southern Lord Records albums
Profound Lore Records albums